CS Camelopardalis (CS Cam) is a binary star in reflection nebula VdB 14, in the constellation Camelopardalis.

It forms a group of stars known as the Camelopardalis R1 association, part of the Cam OB1 association.  The near-identical supergiant CE Camelopardalis is located half a degree to the south.

The primary component, CS Camelopardalis A, is a blue-white B-type supergiant with a mean apparent magnitude of 4.21m.  It is classified as an Alpha Cygni type variable star and its brightness varies from magnitude 4.19m to 4.23m.  Its companion, CS Camelopardalis B, is a magnitude 8.7m star located 2.4 arcseconds from the primary.

References

External links
 Image CS Camelopardalis
 Nebula vdB 14
 Van Den Bergh 14 and 15

021291
016228
Alpha Cygni variables
Binary stars
B-type supergiants
Camelopardalis (constellation)
Camelopardalis, CS
1035
BD+59 0660